The fourth election to West Glamorgan County Council and was held in May 1985. It was preceded by the 1981 election and followed by the 1989 election.

Candidates
Once again, the Labour Party fielded candidates in every ward. In addition to the Conservative Party and Plaid Cymru, a significant number of seats were contested by the SDP/Liberal Alliance. There were fewer Ratepayer candidates than at previous elections.

In the Neath area, Labour contested all thirteen seats, with Plaid Cymru running nine candidates.

Outcome
Labour retained their majority.

Results
 indicates sitting councillor

Ward Results

Aberavon East and West (three seats)

Aberavon North (one seat)

Aberavon South (one seat)

Brynmelyn (two seats)

Castle (two seats)

Cwmafan (one seat)

Fforest Fach (two seats)

Ffynone (two seats)

Glyncorrwg (two seats)

Gower No.1 (one seat)

Gower No.2 (one seat)

Gower No.3 (one seat)

Landore (two seats)

Llansamlet (two seats)

Llwchwr No.1 (one seat)

Llwchwr No.2 (two seats)

Llwchwr No.3 (two seats)

Margam Central (one seat)

Margam North (one seat)

Margam West (one seat)

Morriston (two seats)

Mumbles (two seats)

Neath No.1, South and Briton Ferry (four seats)

Neath No.2, North, Pontrhydyfen and Tonmawr (two seats)

Neath Rural (six seats)

Neath Rural No.5 (one seat)

Penderry (three seats)

Pontardawe No.1 (one seat)

Pontardawe No.2 (two seats)

Pontardawe No.3 (three seats)

St Helens (two seats)

Sketty (two seats)

St Johns (two seats)

St Thomas (two seats)

Townhill (two seats)

Victoria (two seats)

References

West Glamorgan
West Glamorgan County Council elections